Contes may refer to:
 Contes, Alpes-Maritimes, a commune in the Alpes-Maritimes department in France
 Contes, Pas-de-Calais, a commune in the Pas-de-Calais department in France

See also 
 Conte (disambiguation)